Fernand Dieudonné Kitty, born in 1996 in Cotonou, Benin, is a aerobic gymnast.

Career 
Kitty is a silver medalist in mixed duet and a team bronze medalist at the 2018 African Aerobics Championships in Brazzaville.

At the 2020 African Aerobic Gymnastics Championships in Sharm el-Sheikh, he won silver in the team event and bronze in the mixed duet and mixed trio.

References 

1996 births
Living people
Male aerobic gymnasts
Beninese sportsmen